Kalvan Kingmaker is an English language science fiction novel by John F. Carr, the third book in the Kalvan series and the sequel to Great Kings' War.  Roland Green, who was the co-author of the latter, was not able to work on the book with Carr.

Characters

Returning Characters
 Great King Kalvan
 Queen Rylla
 Prince Ptosphes
 Prince Sarrask
 Prince Balthames
 Prince Phrames
 Baron Harmakros
 Highpriest Xentos
 Alkides
 Aspasthar
 Princess Demia
 Grand Master Soton
 Knight Commander Aristocles
 Captain-General Phidestros
 Supreme Priest Sesklos
 Archpriest Anaxthenes
 Archpriest Dracar
 Archpriest Roxthar
 Archpriest Cimon
 Great King Demistophon

New Characters
 Knight-Sergeant Sarmoth
 Warchief Ranjar Sargos
 Aletha
 King Theovacar
 Great King Nestros

References
 John F. Carr, Kalvan Kingmaker, Pequod Press, 2000

2000 American novels
2000 science fiction novels
Kalvan series
Novels by John F. Carr